Triisodon is a genus of extinct mesonychian mammal that existed during the Early Paleocene of New Mexico, North America. The genus was named by Edward Drinker Cope in 1881 as a member of the Acreodi, a now invalid taxon that encompassed both creodonts and mesonychians.  The premolar teeth have three points, hence the generic name (tri=three, don=tooth). Cope described the type specimen of T. quivirensis as "about the size of a wolf." A smaller species has also been identified from the same region.  Since material from this genus is incomplete, the exact size of adults and whether they showed sexual dimorphism or regional variations in size is unknown.

Triisodon is the  type genus of the family Triisodontidae, one of the three families within Mesonychia (the other two being Mesonychidae and Hapalodectidae). Other North American triisodontid genera, including Goniacodon, Eoconodon, and Stelocyon, have been referred to Triisodon. Like many very early mammals, the relationship of triisonodontines to other living and fossil mammals has been uncertain, but most paleontologists currently consider them either mesonychids or the sister group of mesonychids, part of the stem group that led to artiodactyls (including whales) and the ancient South American ungulates.

Species

Genus Triisodon
Trisonodon crassicuspus (= T. rusticus, Goniacodon, “Conoryctes”)
Lower Paleocene (Torrejonian). Much smaller than T. quivirensis and with more elongate third promolar; distinguished from Eoconodon by having a somewhat reduced third molar. 
Triisodon quivirensis (= T. antiquus)
Lower Paleocene (Torrejonian), coexisted in the same habitat with T crassicuspus. Distinguished from T. crassicuspus by much larger size, from Eoconodon as above.
Triisodon heilprinianus identified by Cope, 1882 on the basis of a single molar, has since been referred to multiple groups. Referred to Eoconodon coryphaeus by Kondrashov and Lucas 2006.

References

External links
Paleo Biology
Paleo Information

Mesonychids
Paleocene mammals
Fossil taxa described in 1881
Paleocene mammals of North America
Prehistoric placental genera